The Archdiocese of Yangon is a Latin Church ecclesiastical territory or diocese of the Catholic Church in Myanmar. Charles Bo, SDB was appointed Archbishop of Yangon by Pope John Paul II on May 24, 2003.

History
The diocese was erected as the Apostolic Vicariate of Southwestern Burma by Pope Pius IX on November 27, 1866, and renamed as the Southern Burma on July 19, 1870 and later as the Apostolic Vicariate of Rangoon on May 7, 1953. It was elevated to the rank of a metropolitan archdiocese by Pope Pius XII on January 1, 1955, with the suffragan sees of Mawlamyine, Pathein, Pyay and Hpa-an which was newly erected on 24 January 2009. Pope John Paul II renamed it as the Archdiocese of Yangon on October 8, 1991.

The archdiocese's motherchurch and thus seat of its archbishop is St. Mary's Cathedral.

Statistics
As of 16 July 2007 there are 83 priests and 312 religious in the archdiocese.

Footnotes

See also
Roman Catholicism in Myanmar
List of Roman Catholic dioceses in Burma

External links

Catholic-Hierarchy
GCatholic.org
Official site

Yangon
Christianity in Yangon
Yangon
Yangon
1866 establishments in Burma